The Boonton Township School District is a community public school district that serves students in pre-kindergarten through eighth grade from Boonton Township, in Morris County, New Jersey, United States.

As of the 2020–21 school year, the district, comprised of one school, had an enrollment of 387 students and 44.0 classroom teachers (on an FTE basis), for a student–teacher ratio of 8.8:1.

The district is classified by the New Jersey Department of Education as being in District Factor Group "I", the second-highest of eight groupings. District Factor Groups organize districts statewide to allow comparison by common socioeconomic characteristics of the local districts. From lowest socioeconomic status to highest, the categories are A, B, CD, DE, FG, GH, I and J.

For ninth through twelfth grades, public school students attend Mountain Lakes High School, in Mountain Lakes as part of a sending/receiving relationship agreement. As of the 2020–21 school year, the high school had an enrollment of 641 students and 62.9 classroom teachers (on an FTE basis), for a student–teacher ratio of 10.2:1. Prior to 1991, high school students had attended Boonton High School.

School
Rockaway Valley School had an enrollment of 384 students in grades PreK-8 as of the 2020–21 school year.
Dr. Christian Angelillo, Principal
Dr. Lia Lendis, Assistant Principal

Administration
Core members of the district's administration are:
Dr. Christian Angelillo, Superintendent
John T. Murray II, Business Administrator / Board Secretary

Board of education
The district's board of education is comprised of nine members who set policy and oversee the fiscal and educational operation of the district through its administration. As a Type II school district, the board's trustees are elected directly by voters to serve three-year terms of office on a staggered basis, with three seats up for election each year held (since 2012) as part of the November general election. The board appoints a superintendent to oversee the district's day-to-day operations and a business administrator to supervise the business functions of the district.

References

External links
Rockaway Valley School
 
School Data for the Boonton Township School District, National Center for Education Statistics

Boonton Township, New Jersey
New Jersey District Factor Group I
School districts in Morris County, New Jersey
Public K–8 schools in New Jersey